Kalukhali is an upazila, or sub-district, of the Rajbari District in Dhaka Division, Bangladesh.

Administration
Kalukhali Upazila is divided into seven union parishads: Boalia, Kalikapur, Majhbari, Madapur, Mrigi, Ratandia, and Saorail. The union parishads are subdivided into 153 mauzas and 156 villages.

References 

Upazilas of Rajbari District